Takhtamygda is a rural locality (a selo) and the administrative center of Takhtamygdinsky Selsoviet of Skovorodinsky District, Amur Oblast, Russia. The population was 1,498 as of 2018. There are 18 streets.

Geography 
Takhtamygda is located on the Maly Oldoy River, 40 km northwest of Skovorodino (the district's administrative centre) by road. BAM is the nearest rural locality.

References 

Rural localities in Skovorodinsky District